The Ufag D.I was a high-wing monoplane with monocoque fuselage, powered by a Le Rhône(St) engine. Although there is no direct evidence, it is highly likely that the D.I under construction was the Ufag 60.02.

Variants
D.IService designation for proposed production aircraft
Ufag 60.02 probable designation for the first D.I prototype under construction at the time of the armistice.

Specifications (60.03 / D.I)

References

D.I
1910s Austro-Hungarian fighter aircraft
Monoplanes
Single-engined tractor aircraft